Tylothallia is a genus of lichen in the  family Lecanoraceae. It was circumscribed by German lichenologist Harald Kilias in 1981.

References

Lecanoraceae
Lecanorales genera
Lichen genera